Richard (Dick) Munson is an American author and clean energy advocate. His upcoming book, "Tech to Table: 25 Innovators Reimagining Food," will be released by Island Press in September 2021. His previous book, Tesla: Inventor of the Modern, was published by W.W. Norton in May 2018. Author of five other books with topics that range from U.S. government energy policy to profiles of tycoon George Fabyan and oceanographer Jacques Cousteau, Munson was Director of Midwest Clean Energy for the Environmental Defense Fund, working primarily as a lobbyist for clean energy initiatives in Illinois and Ohio.

Early life and education

Born and raised in Southern California, Munson earned a B.A. from the University of California, Santa Barbara, and an M.A. from the University of Michigan. He lived in Michigan and Washington, D.C., before moving to Chicago, where he is now based.

Munson was first inspired to battle pollution in college, when in early 1969 an oil spill in Santa Barbara, California, blackened beaches, killing thousands of sea birds and other marine life.

Career
Munson has been the Midwest Director of Clean Energy for the Environmental Defense Fund, a global organization whose mission “is to preserve the natural systems on which all life depends.” EDF works in conjunction with business, government and communities to solve environmental problems affecting climate, ecosystems, oceans and health. Previously, Munson was senior vice president of Recycled Energy Development (RED), an Illinois-based industrial waste-to-energy company.

He was also executive director of the Northeast-Midwest Institute and coordinated with the Northeast-Midwest House and Senate Coalitions, bipartisan caucuses that conduct policy research and draft legislation on issues pertaining to agriculture, economic development, energy, the environment, and manufacturing. Other clean energy and environmental groups he has held leadership positions with include the Center for Renewable Resources, Solar Lobby, Sun Day, and the Environmental Action Foundation.

Munson has sat on the boards of Hinsdale Public Library, Elevate Energy, Center for Neighborhood Technology, Illinois Environment Council and Greenleaf Advisors.

Munson is frequently cited in media and serves on panels as an authority on energy policy and electricity markets. He has received public service awards from the Great Lakes Commission, American Small Manufacturers Coalition and the U.S. Clean Heat and Power Association.

Published works 
Munson's upcoming book is "Tech to Table: 25 Innovators Reimagining Food (Island Press, September 2021), has been called "a book we've been waiting for, documenting the entrepreneurial creativity now sweeping through out food and farming space."

His previous book, Tesla: Inventor of the Modern (W.W. Norton, May 2018), follows Nikola Tesla from his childhood in Southern Europe to the United States, working for titans Edison and Westinghouse and exploring the frontier of electrical transmission, to dying alone in a New York hotel. Munson draws on Tesla's letters, technical notebooks, and other primary sources to piece together the personal life and habits of the enigmatic inventor. A Kirkus starred review calls Tesla: Inventor of the Modern “A lucid, expertly researched biography,” and affirms that readers “will absolutely enjoy his sympathetic, insightful portrait.” Booklist says it is a “celebratory, comprehensive profile . . . A well-written, insightful addition to the legacy of this still-underappreciated visionary genius.”

Munson's first book, The Power Makers, was hailed as “a sober and thoughtful analysis of the troubled electricity business” by Washington Monthly, and ranked by them as one of the best political books of the year.

Bibliography 

 " Tech to Table:] 25 Innovators Reimagining Food". Island Press, 2021. 
 Tesla: Inventor of the Modern. W.W. Norton, 2018. 
 George Fabyan: The Tycoon Who Broke Ciphers, Ended Wars, Manipulated Sound, Built a Levitation Machine, and Organized the Modern Research Center. CreateSpace, 2013. 
 From Edison to Enron: The Business of Power and What It Means for the Future of Electricity. Praeger, 2005. 
 The Cardinals of Capitol Hill: The Men and Women Who Control Government Spending. Grove,1993. 
 Cousteau: The Captain and His World. William Morrow & Co, 1989. 
 The Power Makers: The Inside Story of America's Biggest Business and Its Struggle to Control Tomorrow's Electricity. Rodale, 1985. 

 Publications 
 “This Cleantech Hotspot Is Giving New York and California a Run for Their Money,” The Fourth Wave, April 12, 2018. Accessed May 12, 2018.
 “Trump May Greenlight An $8 Billion Attack On Competitive Energy Markets,” Forbes, April 11, 2018. Accessed May 12, 2018.
 “Taxpayers shouldn’t foot the $8 billion bill to bail out a failing energy company,” The Hill, April 7, 2018. Accessed May 12, 2018.
 “Could Blockchain Soon Upend America’s Power Markets?” The Fourth Wave, April 4, 2018. Accessed April 12, 2018.
 “FirstEnergy lobbying seeks to thwart the public's interest in lower electricity rates,” Cleveland Plain Dealer, March 7, 2018 Accessed May 12, 2018.
 “To fight climate change, we must change our vocabulary,” Energy News Network, January 4, 2018. Accessed May 12, 2018.
 “Will Ohio turn its back on electricity competition?” Columbus Dispatch, December 6, 2017. Accessed May 12, 2018.
 “New clean energy law gives Illinois a chance to show national leadership,” Daily Herald, June 19, 2017. Accessed May 12, 2018.
 “As Trump threatens historic climate protections, Midwest Republican governors embrace clean energy economy,” Energy News Network, March 24, 2017. Accessed May 12, 2018.
 “Regulatory Wonderland,” The Fourth Wave, April 6, 2016. Accessed May 12, 2018.
 “As Utilities Embrace Change, FirstEnergy’s Strategy Is Resistance and Protectionism.” Greentech Media,'' August 21, 2015. Accessed May 12, 2018.

References

External links 
 Books by Richard Munson
 Tesla: Inventor of the Modern Website
 Environmental Defense Fund biography
 Renewable Energy World biography

Living people
University of California, Santa Barbara alumni
University of Michigan alumni
Year of birth missing (living people)